Mahajeby is a town and commune in Madagascar. It belongs to the district of Fenoarivobe, which is a part of Bongolava Region. The population of the commune was estimated to be approximately 9,741 in 2018.

Populations of Propithecus coronatus are found in the forest remains nearby.

References and notes 

Populated places in Bongolava